Pinus lawsonii, Lawson's pine, is a species of conifer in the family Pinaceae.
It is found only in Mexico.

References

lawsonii
Least concern plants
Taxonomy articles created by Polbot